The Kelowna Falcons are a collegiate summer baseball team located in Kelowna, British Columbia. The Falcons are members of the West Coast League and play their home games at Elks Stadium.

History
The franchise traces its roots back to the Kelowna Grizzlies, who were founded in 1993. The Grizzlies were members of the Pacific International League. During their tenure the Grizzlies won the 1995 league championship. Following the 1998 the club suspended operations. The franchise was sold in 2000 and rebranded as the Falcons. Kelowna continued this membership with the Pacific International League playing from 2000 through 2004. In 2005 the Falcons along with Bellingham, Bend, Spokane, and Wenatchee left the league to form the West Coast Collegiate Baseball League (WCCBL).

2022 Season
The Falcons are currently 7th in the North Division with a record of 7-10. They are currently 7.5 games behind the division leading Bellingham Bells. Pitcher Nickolas Woodcock (Yavapai College) (Whitby, Ontario) is second in the league in strikeouts (27). The Falcons have sold 7,660 tickets for an average of 884 fans per game.

Play-off Years
2010
2015
2018

Alumni in Major League Baseball
David Riske 
Aaron Harang 
Jason Bay 
Nyjer Morgan 
Chris Davis 
Jess Todd  
James Paxton 
Tyler Wagner
Phil Maton
Connor Joe

References

External links
 Official Kelowna Falcons Website
 West Coast League

Amateur baseball teams in Canada
Baseball teams in British Columbia
Sport in Kelowna
2000 establishments in British Columbia
Baseball teams established in 2000